Plaza Salcedo is a public park in Vigan, Ilocos Sur, Philippines. The park is the longer arm of an L-shaped open space where a popular fountain display is located. Named after the Spanish conquistador Juan de Salcedo, Plaza Salcedo is the city’s town center and is known for being the execution site of Filipina revolutionary Gabriela Silang in September 1873.

References 

Geography of Ilocos Sur
Parks in the Philippines